Mountain Strawberries (산딸기 - Sanddalgi) also known as Wild Strawberry is a 1982 South Korean film directed by Kim Su-hyeong. It was the first entry in the Mountain Strawberries series, inspiring five sequels, the last appearing in 1994.

Background 
Madame Aema, the first "ero" or erotic film to be made after South Korea's government began relaxing its control of the film industry, was released in February 1982. Mountain Strawberries, starring Aema'''s Ahn So-young, debuted in September of that year. "Folk erotic" became one of the popular genres of the erotic film in Korea, and Mountain Strawberries was one of the earliest films in that style. Like many of the South Korean erotic films of this era, Mountain Strawberries'' incorporated melodrama into its softcore pornographic storyline.

Synopsis
Bun-nyeo, a girl in a mountain village loses her virginity to Myong-jun, the village vagabond. After both of her suitors die before they can wed Bun-nyeo, she moves to the city to work in a factory. Myong-jun persuades her to return to the village, but he is arrested for murder. As the film ends, Bun-nyeo is waiting for Myong-jun's release.

Cast
 Ahn So-young
 Nam Koong Won
 Jo Dong-jin
 Kim In-moon
 Jin Yoo-young
 Yang Hyoung-ho
 Kim Min
 Kim Ae-kyung
 Moon Mi-bong
 Jo Jeong-su

Bibliography

English

Korean

Notes

1982 films
South Korean erotic films
1980s Korean-language films